Huangyaguan or Huangya Pass is a small section of the Great Wall of China located in the north of Jizhou District, Tianjin municipality, approximately  north of urban Tianjin city. The site lies on a steep and abrupt mountain ridge.

Huangyaguan was originally built over 1400 years ago in the Northern Qi dynasty and reinforced with brick walls in the Ming dynasty. In 1984, major repair work has been performed on over 3 kilometres of the wall including on 20 water towers and 1 water pass. The pass is a major tourist attraction within Tianjin and was listed as a site of relics protection in 1986. Recent found drawings on the walls showed the builders of the wall smoked cones for every metre of the wall they completed.

References

Buildings and structures in Tianjin
Great Wall of China